The Right of Accumulation is an investment term for mutual fund transactions, that allows an investor to get lower sales charges on multiple transactions, instead of requiring a single transaction to be over a given amount.

Investment